Thomas Theodore Fields Jr. (October 12, 1912 – January 17, 1994) was an American politician. He served as a Democratic member of the Louisiana House of Representatives.

Born in Union Parish, Louisiana, the son of Evelyn Sanders and Harvey Fields, a politician. Fields was the grandson of Theodore T. Fields, a newspaper editor. He worked as a banker. In 1952, Fields won the election for an office of the Louisiana House of Representatives. He succeeded Robert S. Kennedy. In 1964, Fields was succeeded by James Peyton Smith. In 1968, he succeeded Smith for which he had served along with him for an office. In 1972, Fields was succeeded by John C. Ensminger and Louise Brazzel Johnson. He had served at least one idiom for which he was succeeded by David 'Bo' Ginn in 1979.

Fields died in January 1994 in Louisiana, at the age of 81. He was buried in Farmerville Cemetery, in which he was buried along with his wife Ruth.

References 

1912 births
1994 deaths
People from Union Parish, Louisiana
Democratic Party members of the Louisiana House of Representatives
20th-century American politicians
American bankers
Burials in Louisiana